Engin Fırat (born 11 June 1970) is a Turkish football manager who is currently the manager of the Kenya national team.

Early life
Firat was born on 11 June 1970 in Istanbul. He began his football career when he was 10. After retiring as player, he started his very successful coaching career. He is known as a Coach with a lot of international experience and success. Firat is an expert in tactics (a lot of wins in historical matches) and a strong leader.

Managerial career

Early years
Firat graduated from Sports University in Germany. He started his professional career as an assistant coach for German legend Horst Hrubesch in Samsunspor in 1997. This made Firat the youngest professional football coach in Europe.
Samsunspor finished the season with an excellent 5th place in Süper Lig. As a 27-year-old in pro-soccer, he quickly earned his respect with the club and the players. So it was no surprise when Hrubesch was sent by the club, Firat was asked to stay and become the assistant coach of new head coach, Joseph Jaranbinsky from the Czech Republic. The next season Jarabinsky and Firat joined league rivals Antalyaspor. They finished a very successful season in the 6th spot, with the highest total points and rank in the club's history.

Eintracht Frankfurt and Fenerbahçe
Between 2000 and 2002, Firat was a member of the technical staff of Bundesliga team Eintracht Frankfurt. He also did scouting for the team. Firat joined Turkish giants Fenerbahçe S.K., as an assistant coach of German head coach Werner Lorant in 2002. They finished 2nd in the league and their historical 6–0 win over rivals, Galatasaray was the highlight of the season.

LR Ahlen
In January 2003, Lorant and Firat took over 2. Bundesliga side, LR Ahlen. The team was 17th at the beginning of the second half of the season finished far away from the relegation spots. They ranked 5th on the 2nd half of the season ranking. After Lorant was resigned as the club head coach, Firat became head coach for three games, that made him only the second Turkish head coach in German Bundesliga history, after Mustafa Denizli.

Incheon United
In 2004, Lorant and Firat joined the newly founded south-Korean Pro team Incheon United. Due to family reasons Firat left the team after pre-season camp but was returned to the club one month later and also guided the team in five matches.

Return to Turkey
At the start of the 2005–06 season, Lorant and Firat took over the Turkish side, Sivasspor. Sivasspor just went up from 2nd division and the coaching duo managed to create the most interesting team that season and they finished at a very surprising 8th place. Also, they won the ''Cup of the Republic during pre-season.

Saipa and Iranian national team
Firat was once again worked with Lorant as an assistant coach, this time at Iran Pro League side, Saipa. As Lorant resigned after three months, despite leading the league, the club offered Firat to continue his work as the new head coach. Saipa took the boost from the league-lead and finished the season as surprising champions of the IPL. In March 2008, Ali Daei was appointed as the head coach of Iran national football team and asked Firat to become his First coach. In his time the Iranian National team never lost any match.

Sepahan
After coming to agreement with Ali Daei and the football federation, Firat signed a head coaching job with last season's runner up and Asian Champions League finalist Sepahan.

Firat was among the candidates to become head coach of Nigeria to lead the team in 2010 FIFA World Cup, a job he rejected. Engin Firat just recently was honoured with an award, as best Turkish coach abroad, by Celik Bilek Ödülleri in Turkey.
In the next years Firat was active in the Coaching Education of Iranian Coaches.

Gostaresh Foolad
After Luka Bonačić resigned to become the head coach of Sepahan, Firat was appointed as the club head coach for 2011–12 season. Firat led the team in first twelve matches but resigned in October 2011. After Firat left Iran he got offers from Galati (Romania), Rizespor and Konyaspor (Turkey) which he refused.

Return to Saipa as head coach
On 11 May 2013, it was announced that Firat will act as the manager of Saipa for the upcoming season. His first match as manager of Saipa was a 1–1 draw over Damash Gilan. In this season he created a new generation of young talented players. Saipa even won for the first time in the club history at home against powerhouse Persepolis. He led Saipa with the lowest budget and the youngest team in the league to 8th place, which was the best result in the last seven years for Saipa. Firat got a lot of offers to stay in Iran and some lucrative offers from UAE Pro-League, but in the last weeks of the league he got an Achilles tendon rupture in the training. Therefore, he decided to rest for a while.

Later careers
In November 2014, Firat was offered the assistant coach position by Galatasaray. Firat refused to work with head coach Cesare Prandelli. At the same time, newspapers in Bosnia and Herzegovina wrote that Firat is a top candidate as new head coach of Bosnian national team.

Firat made a surprise move in June 2015 and accepted an offer from last year UEFA Cup participant Karabükspor as club's general manager. Karabükspor promoted to the Turkish Super League.

In 2016 Fırat was chosen as Vice President of the TÜFAD Europe (European Turkish Coaches Association).

From 2018, Firat took over Vllaznia Shkoder as Sports Director. The Team came back to the successful days of their history.

Moldova
On 28 October 2019, Fırat was announced as the new manager of the Moldova national team. 
Firat changed also here the playing Style of the Team and produced Historical Performance for Moldova. Some Matches like the 1:2 in Paris against World Champion France
and 0:0 in Russia, will be never forgotten in the Country. He was chosen 2019 as Coach of the Year.

He left his position in 2021, his successor was Roberto Bordin.

Kenya
He first took charge of the Kenya National Team on 7 October 2021. In his first match, Kenya lost 0–5 against Mali in CAF World cup qualifiers match. This was followed by a 1–0 against same opponents thereby ending Kenyan chances of qualifying for the World cup

Statistics

Honours

Assistant managerFenerbahçeSüper Lig: 2001–02 (Runner-up)Sivasspor
TFF First League: 2005–06

Saipa
Iran Pro League: 2006–07

Iran
WAFF Championship: 2008

Sports Director
TFF 1. League: 2015–16 (Champion)

Head coach
Iran Pro League: 2008–09 (3. and qualified for Asian Champions League)
Best Turkish Coach abroad: 2009, 2011
Moldova: 2019 (Coach of the Year)

References

External links
 Firat Website
 ENGİN FIRAT’A SÜRPRİZ TEKLİF haberi – 24.02.2010 10:25

1970 births
Living people
Sportspeople from Istanbul
Turkish football managers
German football managers
Association football coaches
German people of Turkish descent
Turkish emigrants to West Germany
Expatriate football managers in Iran
German expatriate football managers
Eintracht Frankfurt non-playing staff
Rot Weiss Ahlen managers
3. Liga managers
Incheon United FC managers
Kayseri Erciyesspor managers
Sepahan S.C. managers
Turkish expatriate football managers
Turkish expatriate sportspeople in Iran
Moldova national football team managers
Kenya national football team managers
Expatriate football managers in Moldova
Expatriate football managers in South Korea
German expatriate sportspeople in South Korea
Persian Gulf Pro League managers
Turkish expatriate sportspeople in South Korea
German expatriate sportspeople in Iran
People from Aurich
Sportspeople from Lower Saxony
Turkish expatriate sportspeople in Kenya
Expatriate football managers in Kenya
German expatriate sportspeople in Kenya
German expatriate sportspeople in Moldova
Turkish expatriate sportspeople in Moldova